Luc Monéger (born 4 March 1974) is a French former ice dancer. With partner Bérangère Nau, he is the 1993 Penta Cup champion, 1993 Grand Prix International St. Gervais bronze medalist, 1993 World Junior bronze medalist, and 1994 French national bronze medalist. The duo represented France at the 1994 Winter Olympics, placing 14th.

Results 
With Nau

References

1974 births
Living people
French male ice dancers
Olympic figure skaters of France
Figure skaters at the 1994 Winter Olympics
Sportspeople from Angers
World Junior Figure Skating Championships medalists